The United Counties League operated three divisions in the English football league system for the first time since the 1979–80 season. These are the Premier Divisions North and South at Step 5, both firsts in the league, and Division One at Step 6.

The allocations for Steps 5 and 6 were announced by The Football Association on 18 May 2021, and were subject to appeal.

After the abandonment of the 2019–20 and 2020–21 seasons due to the COVID-19 pandemic in England, numerous promotions were decided on a points per game basis over the previous two seasons. As part of the National League System's restructure, the FA's Alliance and Leagues Committees recommended the league's expansion to gain another Step 5 division. At the end of the past season, Shepshed Dynamo left the league through promotion to the new Northern Premier League Division One Midlands, the only former Premier Division club to do so.

Premier Division North
The remaining nine teams from the old Premier Division, together with the following, formed the Premier Division North for 2021–22:

Promoted from Division One
Melton Town
Promoted from the East Midlands Counties League
Eastwood Community
Heanor Town
Promoted from the Northern Counties East League
Skegness Town

Transferred from the Midland League
Gresley Rovers
Heather St John's
Long Eaton United
Newark
Selston

Premier Division North table

Stadia and locations

Premier Division South
The remaining 10 teams from the old Premier Division, together with the following, formed the Premier Division South for 2021–22:

Promoted from Division One
 Bugbrooke St Michaels
 Long Buckby
Promoted from the Midland League
 Hinckley LRFC
Transferred from the Eastern Counties League
 Godmanchester Rovers
Transferred from the Hellenic League
 Easington Sports
Transferred from the Midland League
 Coventry Sphinx
 Coventry United
Transferred from the Spartan South Midlands League
 Biggleswade United
 Eynesbury Rovers
 Newport Pagnell Town
 Potton United

Premier Division South table

Stadia and locations

Division One
At the end of the 2020–21 season, the following teams left the division:

Promoted to Premier Division North
 Melton Town
Promoted to Premier Division South
 Bugbrooke St Michaels
 Long Buckby
Transferred to the Eastern Counties League
 Huntingdon Town
 Whittlesey Athletic

Transferred to the Spartan South Midlands League
 Burton Park Wanderers
 Irchester United
 Northampton Sileby Rangers
 Raunds Town
 Rushden & Higham United
 Wellingborough Whitworth

The remaining nine teams, together with the following, formed Division One for 2021–22: 

Transferred from the East Midland Counties League
 Barrow Town
 Belper United
 Borrowash Victoria
 Clifton All Whites
 Dunkirk
 Gedling Miners Welfare
 Graham Street Prims
 Hucknall Town
 Ingles
 Kimberley Miners Welfare
 Radford
 West Bridgford

Transferred from the Midland League
 Hinckley
 Kirby Muxloe

Division One table

Stadia and locations

References

External links
United Counties League The FA Full-Time

United Counties League seasons
9